The Guaracara River, located in south Trinidad, runs westward approximately 30 km long, out of the Central Range and drains into the Gulf of Paria.  It forms the boundary between the city of San Fernando (to the south) and the Couva-Tabaquite-Talparo Regional Corporation. In local terms it separates Marabella (the northernmost portion of the city) from Pointe-à-Pierre.

The river is heavily polluted, both by non-point agricultural and residential run-off from Marabella and the town of Gasparillo, and from industrial waste (primarily oily run-off) from the oil refinery at Pointe-a-Pierre owned by Petrotrin (the state-owned oil company).

Rivers of Trinidad and Tobago
Trinidad (island)
Gulf of Paria